S. coccinea  may refer to:
 Sarcoscypha coccinea, the scarlet elf cup or scarlet cup, a fungus species found in Africa, Asia, Europe, North America and Australia
 Sophronitis coccinea, a orchid species found from Brazil to Argentina

See also
 Coccinea (disambiguation)